Malika Pukhraj (Punjabi) (1912 – 2004) was a highly popular Ghazal and folk singer of Pakistan. She was generally known as "Malika", meaning "The Queen", publicly. She was extremely popular for her rendition of Hafeez Jalandhri's nazm song, Abhi tau main jawan hoon ("I am still young"), which is enjoyed by millions not only in Pakistan, but also in India. Others among her popular numbers in Urdu language were Lo phir basant aaii, Quli Qutub's Piya baaj piyala piya jaey na, and Faiz Ahmed Faiz's Mere qatil mere dildar mere paas raho.

Early life
Malika Pukhraj was born in Hamirpur Sidhar to a Singer family of professional musicians. She was given the name "Malika" at birth by Baba Roti Ram 'Majzoob', a spiritualist, in the Akhnoor area, and named Pukhraj (Yellow Sapphire) by her aunt who herself was a professional singer-dancer.

Malika Pukhraj received her traditional musical training from Ustad Ali Baksh Kasuri, the father of legendary singer Ustad Bade Ghulam Ali Khan.

Performing career
At the age of nine, she visited Jammu and performed at the coronation ceremony of Maharaja Hari Singh, who was so impressed by her voice that he appointed her as a court singer in his Durbar. She stayed there as a singer for another nine years.

She was among the well-known professional singers of India in the 1940s and after Partition of India in 1947, she migrated to Lahore, Pakistan, where she received much more fame, through her radio performances with composer Kale Khan at Radio Pakistan, Lahore. Her voice is most suitable for 'folk songs of the hills' (Pahari Songs).

In 1980, she received the Pride of Performance Award from the President of Pakistan. In 1977, when All India Radio, for which she sang until the Partition in 1947, was celebrating its Golden Jubilee, she was invited to India and awarded with the 'Legend of Voice' award. Malika Pukhraj also recorded her memoirs in the novel Song Sung True.

Personal life
Malika Pukhraj was married to Shabbir Hussain, a junior government official in the Punjab, and had six children including Tahira Syed, also a singer in Pakistan.

Death
Malika Pukhraj died in Lahore, Pakistan on 4 February 2004. Her funeral procession started from her residence at West Canal bank, and the ceremony was held in the house of her eldest son.

Awards and recognition
 Legend of Voice Award (1977) by All India Radio
 Pride of Performance (1980) by the President of Pakistan

References

External links
 

1912 births
2004 deaths
Pakistani Muslims
Punjabi people
Pakistani women singers
Pakistani ghazal singers
People from Jammu (city)
Singers from Lahore
Recipients of the Pride of Performance
Punjabi singers
Pakistani folk singers
Indian women folk singers
20th-century Pakistani women singers
Indian folk singers
20th-century Indian singers
Punjabi-language singers
20th-century Indian women singers
Singers from Jammu and Kashmir
Women musicians from Jammu and Kashmir
21st-century Indian singers
21st-century Indian women singers
Pakistani radio personalities
21st-century Pakistani women singers
Pakistani classical singers
Radio personalities from Lahore
Pakistani playback singers